Slobodan Kovač (born 13 September 1967) is a Serbian volleyball coach and former volleyball player, Olympic Champion Sydney 2000, bronze medallist at the Olympic Games Atlanta 1996.

Career

As a coach
In 2014, he was appointed new head coach of the Iranian national volleyball team until the Olympic Games Rio 2016. From 2010 to 2014, Kovač was head coach of the Italian team, Sir Safety Perugia. In 2016, he became new head coach of Halkbank Ankara. In 2017, he took charge of the Slovenian national volleyball team.

Sporting achievements

As a player
 National championships
 1988/1989  Yugoslavian Championship, with Vojvodina Novi Sad
 1991/1992  Serbia and Montenegro Cup, with Vojvodina Novi Sad
 1991/1992  Serbia and Montenegro Championship, with Vojvodina Novi Sad

As a coach
 CEV Challenge Cup
  2018/2019 – with Belogorie Belgorod

 National championships
 2008/2009  Serbian Championship, with Radnički Kragujevac
 2009/2010  Serbian Championship, with Radnički Kragujevac
 2016/2017  Turkish Championship, with Halkbank Ankara
 2017/2018  Turkish Cup, with Halkbank Ankara
 2017/2018  Turkish Championship, with Halkbank Ankara

Individual awards
 2008: Coach of the Year in Serbia
 2009: Coach of the Year in Serbia
 2010: Coach of the Year in Serbia
 2013: Coach of the Year in Italy
 2014: Coach of the Year in Italy
 2019: CEV – Coach of the Year
 2019: Coach of the Year by the Olympic Committee of Serbia

See also
 Matches of Serbian men's volleyball national team conducted by Slobodan Kovač

References

External links

 
 
 Coach profile at LegaVolley.it 
 Player profile at LegaVolley.it   
 Coach/Player profile at Volleybox.net
 Player profile at the International Olympic Committee
 Player profile at Olympedia.org

1967 births
Living people
People from Veliko Gradište
Yugoslav men's volleyball players
Serbia and Montenegro men's volleyball players
Serbian volleyball coaches
Volleyball coaches of international teams
Olympic volleyball players of Yugoslavia
Volleyball players at the 1996 Summer Olympics
Medalists at the 1996 Summer Olympics
Volleyball players at the 2000 Summer Olympics
Medalists at the 2000 Summer Olympics
Olympic medalists in volleyball
Olympic gold medalists for Federal Republic of Yugoslavia
Olympic bronze medalists for Federal Republic of Yugoslavia
European champions for Serbia and Montenegro
Competitors at the 1991 Mediterranean Games
Mediterranean Games medalists in volleyball
Mediterranean Games silver medalists for Yugoslavia
Serbian expatriate sportspeople in Italy
Expatriate volleyball players in Italy
Serbian expatriate sportspeople in Greece
Expatriate volleyball players in Greece
Serbian expatriate sportspeople in France
Expatriate volleyball players in France
Serbian expatriate sportspeople in Iran
Expatriate volleyball players in Iran
Serbian expatriate sportspeople in Turkey
Serbian expatriate sportspeople in Slovenia
Serbian expatriate sportspeople in Russia
Serbian expatriate sportspeople in Poland
Jastrzębski Węgiel coaches
Skra Bełchatów coaches
Outside hitters